Timothy John Smiley FBA (born 13 November 1930) is a British philosopher, appointed Emeritus Knightbridge Professor of Philosophy at Clare College, Cambridge University. He works primarily in philosophy of mathematics and logic.

Life and career

Timothy Smiley was born in London, the son of Professor M. T. Smiley and Mrs T. M. Smiley (née Browne). He was educated at Ardwyn Grammar School, Aberystwyth, followed by Ampleforth College, then went up to Clare College, Cambridge to read Mathematics in 1949. He obtained his BA degree in 1952 followed by a PhD in 1956 on natural systems of logic.

After completing his PhD, he remained at Cambridge on a Research Fellowship at Clare (1955–59), then as a tutor and lecturer in philosophy. He also qualified as a pilot in the Air Ministry and was called to the bar at Gray's Inn.

In 1980 he was appointed Knightbridge Professor of Philosophy, a post he held until his retirement in 1998. In 1982–83 he was President of the Aristotelian Society and in 1984 he was elected a Fellow of the British Academy.

He is the father of the author Sophie Smiley.

Work

Timothy Smiley has published in a wide range of philosophical areas, including Aristotle, definite descriptions, modal logic, multiple conclusion logic, negation and denial, plurals, set-theoretic foundations for mathematics and validity.

In recent years, he has collaborated on a number of articles on plural descriptions with Alex Oliver.

Most recently, Smiley's professional standing was marked by the publication of The Force of Argument: Essays in Honor of Timothy Smiley (T. J. Smiley, Jonathan Lear and Alex Oliver, Routledge, 2010)

Published works

He has edited and contributed to numerous papers and publications. A full bibliography of his work is included in his Festschrift, The Force of Argument: Essays in Honor of Timothy Smiley.

Books

Studies in the Philosophy of Logic and Knowledge, (co-edited with Thomas Baldwin.)
Mathematics and Necessity: Essays in the History of Philosophy
Philosophical Logic
Philosophical Dialogues: Plato, Hume, Wittgenstein. Dawes Hicks Lectures on Philosophy
Smiley and D. J. Shoesmith, Multiple-Conclusion Logic (1978) (see multiple-conclusion logic)
Smiley and Alex Oliver, Plural Logic (2013) 

Selected papers

 Sense Without Denotation. Analysis 1960; 20 (6): 125–135. doi: 10.1093/analys/20.6.125
 What is syllogism?. Journal of Philosophical Logic 1973 (2): 136–154.
 The Theory of Descriptions.  (1981) In T. J. Smiley & Thomas Baldwin (eds.), Studies in the Philosophy of Logic and Knowledge. Published for the British Academy by Oxford University Press. pp. 131–61.
 Aristotle's completeness proof. Ancient Philosophy. 1994 (14): 25–38.

References

External links 
 Clare College, Cambridge

1930 births
British philosophers
Living people
Alumni of Clare College, Cambridge
Fellows of Clare College, Cambridge
People educated at Ampleforth College
Presidents of the Aristotelian Society
Fellows of the British Academy
Knightbridge Professors of Philosophy